is the thirty-sixth single of Japanese solo artist Gackt, released on December 9, 2009. Both sides are theme songs for the video game Samurai Warriors 3.

Overview
With the single, Gackt collaborated with Koei on their new Wii game Samurai Warriors 3. The title song was the game's theme song, while "Zan" the ending theme song. The songs were performed on March 6 and 7, in the festival at the Saitama Super Arena, organized by Koei to promote their new game.

The songs are distinctive for their blend of modern Western musical instruments and the traditional Japanese instruments, a kind of music called by Gackt as "Zipangu" rock, from which the country of origin (Japan) can be sensed.

It was the last single released by his own label Dears, supported by Nippon Crown, before transferred to Avex Group in 2010.

Music video
Gackt announced he has chosen three members from popular visual kei bands to be featured in the music video of single. These members are Ni-ya from Nightmare on bass, Tsukasa from D'espairsRay on drums and Shun from Duel Jewel on guitar. You Kurosaki, from his supporting live band, filled the second guitarist spot.

Track listing

Notes
 , while literally meaning "snow, moon, and flowers", comes from a poem by Bai Juyi and is used to describe serene beauty. "Setsugekka" is also the name of the white cultivar of the Okinawan Camellia sasanqua flower.

Charts

Oricon sales chart

Billboard Japan

References

2009 singles
Gackt songs